iDream Tiruppur Tamizhans (formerly known as iDream Karaikudi Kaalai) is a cricket team, representing Tiruppur City, which plays in the Tamil Nadu Premier League, a tournament hosted by the Tamil Nadu Cricket Association. The franchise is owned by iDream Cinemas and iDream Properties. The franchise was founded in 2016. The team is coached by former Tamil Nadu all rounder, Yo Mahesh.

Seasons 
The tournament has adopted a play-off style game plan for the top four teams. In the 2016 edition, Karaikudi Kaalai finished fifth and missed the cut to qualify for the playoffs. The franchise qualified  in the 2017 and 2018 editions, but lost in the eliminator match in the playoff stage. In 2019, it finished last with only one win from seven matches and in the following season in 2021, it finished last with just two wins.

2022 Squad 
 Anirudha Srikkanth (c)
 Subramanian Anand
 S Mohan Prasath
 S Siddharth
 S Aravind
 Maan K Bafna
 P Francis Rokins
 K Gowtham Thamarai Kannan
 Aswin Crist A
 Tushar Raheja
 A Karuppusamy
 M Mohammed 
Sharun Kumar
Parthasarathy G
 Saathiyaannaryan L
 Mohan Prasath S
 Maan K Bafna
 R Rajkumar
 Natarajan ST
 Dinesh Karthik
 Selvam Suresh Kumar
 B Arunkumar

Support Staff

 S.Ashok anand - (COO & Manager)
 Yo Mahesh - (Head Coach)
 RX Muralidhar - (Batting Coach)
 CS Santhosh - (Fielding Coach)
 P.Satheesh Kumar - (Physio)
 Johnson Selvakumar - (Strength & Condition Coach)
 Varun Narendar - (Performance Analyst)
 Aldrin Appukuttan - (Masseur)
 Palaniappan - (Fielding Asst)
 P.Vijaikumar - (Asst. Manager)
 Jesu Babu Honeymen -(Asst. Coach)
 G.Sarath Kumar - (Co-ordinator)
 D.Matheskumar - (Throw down)
 Sujith R Rajan - (Media)

References 

Tamil Nadu Premier League